Triple Falls is a 125-foot (38 m) waterfall located in the DuPont State Forest, southeast of Brevard, North Carolina.

Geology
Triple Falls flows on the Little River through the DuPont State Forest in Transylvania County.  It is one of 4 major waterfalls on the Little River in this area, the others being High Falls, Hooker Falls, and Bridal Veil Falls.  Triple Falls has 3 distinct, different types of waterfalls.

History
Triple Falls has been known for years to local residents.  In the 1990s, DuPont Forest was sold to the State of North Carolina, and as DuPont has completed cleanup of various areas, those areas have been made open to the public.  A photograph of Triple Falls was one of the tools used to convince the state to purchase the property, which is now a  state forest.

Visiting Triple Falls
Visitors may park at the Hooker Falls parking area, and then hike the Triple Falls / High Falls Trail for roughly 1/2 mile. There are 2 views of the falls, one of the base, where you can only see the bottom falls, and a second upper overlook that lets you view the entire falls.

DuPont State Forest may also allow access to the falls by vehicle to handicapped persons. Contact the DuPont State Forest for more information.

As with all waterfalls, visitors are strongly discouraged from climbing the rocks near the falls.  There have been many deaths at Triple Falls.

Nearby falls
High Falls
Hooker Falls
Bridal Veil Falls
Wintergreen Falls
Connestee Falls and Batson Creek Falls
Key Falls
Glen Cannon Falls
Turley Falls

In popular culture
The waterfall was also featured in a scene in the movies The Last of the Mohicans and The Hunger Games.

References

External links 
North Carolina Waterfalls Dupont State Forest Page

Protected areas of Transylvania County, North Carolina
Waterfalls of North Carolina
DuPont State Forest
Waterfalls of Transylvania County, North Carolina